David Yeung is the co-founder of Green Monday, founder of social enterprise Mind Reset Institute, soul book "Communication Positive Energy", "Starting Positive Energy" and "Dong Du Zen". The author, "East Weekly", "Warm the World", etNet and other columnists, hosted the celebrity "Run Vegetarian" column in U Magazine. He used to be the host of the Hong Kong Metro Finance and Economics Channel, and also served as a guest on TV programs, including wireless, Cable, NowTV and Phoenix Satellite TV. In addition, Yang has been invited to give lectures on Buddhism, soul and environmental protection for many Fortune 500 companies and universities, and was selected as the 2015 Hong Kong Top Ten Outstanding Youth by the International Youth Chamber of Commerce, "JMEN" awarded "Men of the Year 2013" award, Ming Pao Weekly "2013 Local Heroes" award, Hong Kong Management Association "2013 Outstanding Market Illustration" Bronze Award, East Weekly "2013 Outstanding Enterprise Illustration" award, Roadshow "Green Star" Environmental Protection Award, Baccarat Magazine 45 young leaders in Hong Kong, "Purpose Economy" "Asia's 100 Outstanding Leaders", Fast Company "China Business 100 Most Creative People", U Magazine My Favorite Hong Kong Environmental Figure 2016, etc.

Education 
Yeung graduated from Columbia University in the United States in 1998 with a B.S. degree.

Career 
Yeung started his career as a consultant for Wing Dao Certified Public Accountants in the United States for about a year. He witnessed the craze for the Internet. He and his friends opened an Internet company, but in the next year, it boiled. As the US Nasdaq Index dropped from five thousand to one thousand, his company vanished. In 2003, he returned to Hong Kong from the United States and joined a family company as an assistant to the chairman. Later, he acquired shares in Shine* and Visual Culture in his own name, focusing on selling high-end fashion clothes and eyewear in Harbour City, Central, Causeway Bay, Tsim Sha Tsui, Beijing, and Shanghai. There are also branches, which specialize in European, American and Japanese fashion and eyewear, and are loved by stars such as Joey Yung and Charlene Choi.

Yeung is the founder of Green Monday. Yeung is also the founder of OmniPork.

Awards 
 2018 Social Entrepreneur of the Year award. Presented at the World Economic Forum.
 2020 EY Entrepreneur of the Year China awards. Presented by Ernst & Young.

References

External links 
 David Yeung at Business Insider

Ashoka Fellows
Hong Kong chief executives
Living people
Year of birth missing (living people)
Columbia School of Engineering and Applied Science alumni